is a Japanese manga series written and illustrated by Kōji Seo. The series first volume was digitally released in North America by Digital Manga.

Plot
Princess Lucia of the demon realm decides that she must have a child with Yuta, a normal human student, as the child born from their union would possess great power.  However, two angels, Rie and Eru, are intent on keeping her from achieving her goal.

Characters
The series has four main characters:

A princess from the demon realm who believes that if she were to have a child with Yuta it would be amazingly powerful due to his date of birth.

A normal student who happened to be born on 6 June at 6:06:06 during the sixth year of the Heisei period (1994).

 and 
Two angels dedicated to keeping Lucia from having a child with Yuta.

Release
Kōji Seo began the series as a one-shot in Mag Garden's Monthly Comic Blade in the September 2008 issue, before launching it as a bi-monthly serialized title in the magazine's March 2009 issue.  The series went on hiatus before resuming on 30 May 2014.  When the Comic Blade magazine ceased print publication on 30 July 2014, the series was moved to Mag Garden's new Monthly Comic Garden magazine starting on 1 September 2014, while also continuing publication on Comic Blade's website.  The series concluded on 5 October 2015.

Seo released an artbook for the series, on 9 November 2012.

In November 2013, Digital Manga announced that they had licensed the first three volumes of the series for publication in North America under their Project-H imprint. The publisher regularly licenses series on a volume-by-volume basis. It released the first volume digitally on 15 December 2014. The print volumes were originally scheduled to be released in March, June, and September 2015, respectively. The first volume was later rescheduled to January 2016, but missed that window also.  In May 2016, Digital Manga launched PeCChi, a new imprint that focused on non-pornographic adult titles, and announced that several of its former Project-H titles would be transferring to the new imprint, starting with Princess Lucia, but this did not happen.

Volumes
The series was collected into five tankōbon volumes between 2009 and 2015.

References

External links

  at Mag Garden 
 

Mag Garden manga
Digital Manga Publishing titles
Shōnen manga
Romantic comedy anime and manga
Works by Kōji Seo